The 1931 Oregon Webfoots football team represented the University of Oregon in the Pacific Coast Conference (PCC) during the 1931 college football season.  In their second and final season under head coach Clarence Spears, the Webfoots compiled a 6–2–2 record (3–1–1 against PCC opponents), finished in third place in the PCC, and outscored their opponents, 90 to 87. The team played its home games at Hayward Field in Eugene, Oregon.

Schedule

References

Oregon
Oregon Ducks football seasons
Oregon Webfoots football